Children of Ruin is a 2019 science fiction novel by author Adrian Tchaikovsky, the second in his Children of Time series. The novel was well received, winning the 2019 BSFA Award for Best Novel.

The book was followed by the sequel Children of Memory in 2022.

Synopsis
A long time ago, humanity spread out into the stars with the aim of terraforming other worlds for future colonization. In one of these star systems, alien life was discovered, but it was not as primitive as it first appeared.

Thousands of years later, the descendants of humanity and their new arachnid allies follow a mysterious radio signal to a distant star, hoping to find the society of another of mankind's legacies. What they find is a system in chaos as warring factions struggle against the tide of what the terraformers awoke long ago.

Reception
The book was met with critical acclaim. Writing for Locus, Paul Di Filippo said that "Tchaikovsky performs all the wonders of the first book, while at the same time making some quantum jumps in his sequel". The Fantasy Hive writer T.O. Munro felt the novel "is as vividly colourful as an octopus in the throes of emotion". Likewise, Three Crows Magazine writer Olivia Hofer wrote "Children of Ruin is a truly original, evolution-based science fiction novel unlike any other", but said that "despite being a gripping sequel, is very similar to its predecessor. Perhaps too similar".

References

External links
 
 Children of Time series on Adrian Tchaikovsky official website

2019 British novels
2019 science fiction novels
Novels set on fictional planets
Works about women in war
Tor Books books